Russell Javors (born June 13, 1952) is an American rock guitarist. He is best known as a rhythm guitarist for Billy Joel from 1976 to 1989.

Career
At age 15, Javors was performing songs with his childhood friend Liberty DeVitto. He met Doug Stegmeyer in high school and along with Howard Emerson, formed the band Topper.

Together they performed the songs that Javors wrote. Topper became noticed by Billy Joel. Joel found he needed a bassist on his Streetlife Serenade tour and invited Stegmeyer to join him. Javors, DeVitto, and Emerson soon followed. With the addition of multi-instrumentalist  Richie Cannata, Topper became the Billy Joel Band. Javors played rhythm guitar with Joel from 1975 until 1989.

On October 23, 2014, Javors, Cannata, and DeVitto (with Stegmeyer, posthumously) were inducted into the Long Island Music Hall of Fame, primarily for their work with Joel. Shortly thereafter, Javors, Cannata, and DeVitto officially formed The Lords of 52nd Street band; the band also includes a pianist and lead vocalist, keyboardist, and a guitarist, and plays faithful renditions of the recorded Joel originals.

Javors also wrote two songs and played guitar on Karen Carpenter's 1979 self-titled album, which was released in 1996.

See also
Billy Joel Band

Billy Joel album credits
1976 Turnstiles
1978 52nd Street
1980 Glass Houses
1981 Songs in the Attic
1982 The Nylon Curtain
1983 An Innocent Man
1985 Greatest Hits Volume I & II
1986 The Bridge
1987 КОНЦЕРТ
1997 Greatest Hits Volume III

References

1952 births
Living people
People from Long Island
Songwriters from New York (state)
American rock guitarists
American male guitarists
Rhythm guitarists
American session musicians
American harmonica players
Guitarists from New York (state)
20th-century American guitarists
20th-century American male musicians
Billy Joel Band members